Isabella is a census-designated place and unincorporated community in Major County, Oklahoma, United States. Its population was 136 as of the 2010 census. Isabella has a post office with ZIP code 73747.

Demographics

References

Census-designated places in Oklahoma
Unincorporated communities in Major County, Oklahoma
Unincorporated communities in Oklahoma